The Sudan national badminton team represents Sudan in international badminton team competitions. It is controlled by the Sudan Badminton Federation, the national governing body for Sudanese badminton. The Sudanese team is affiliated with the Sudan Olympic Committee and the Badminton Confederation of Africa.

History

Men's team 
The Sudanese men's debuted in the 2007 Pan Arab Games. The team failed to get past the group stages.

Women's team 
The Sudanese women's team first competed in the 2007 Pan Arab Games. The team won their first medal in badminton when they reached the semi-finals. The team lost to Syria in the semi-finals.

Participation in Pan Arab Games 

Men's team

Women's team

Current squad 

Men
Osman Hassan Awad Mohamedkhair
Haitham Hassan

Women
Susan Abdullah
Munira Abkar

References 

Badminton
National badminton teams